In mathematics, the Bass–Quillen conjecture relates vector bundles over a regular Noetherian ring A and over the polynomial ring . The conjecture is named for Hyman Bass and Daniel Quillen, who formulated the conjecture.

Statement of the conjecture
The conjecture is a statement about finitely generated projective modules. Such modules are also referred to as vector bundles.

The conjecture asserts that for a regular Noetherian ring A the assignment

yields a bijection

Known cases
This question was raised by Jean-Pierre Serre and was later proved by Quillen and Suslin, see Quillen–Suslin theorem.

Extensions
The set of isomorphism classes of vector bundles of rank r over A can also be identified with the nonabelian cohomology group

Positive results about the homotopy invariance of 

References

 
 

Commutative algebra
Algebraic K-theory
Algebraic geometry